Banksia shanklandiorum is a species of dense shrub that is endemic to Western Australia. It has hairy stems, pinnatipartite to pinnatisect leaves with sharply-pointed lobes, pink to gold-coloured flowers in heads of about 100, and egg-shaped follicles.

Description

Taxonomy
This species was first formally described in 1988 by Roderick Peter Randall who gave it the name Dryandra shanklandiorum and published the description in Botanische Jahrbücher für Systematik, Pflanzengeschichte und Pflanzengeographie from specimens he collected near Dowerin in 1985.

In 2007 Austin Mast and Kevin Thiele transferred all dryandras to the genus Banksia and renamed this species Banksia shanklandiorum.

Distribution and habitat
Banksia shanklandiorum grows in tall shrubland between Cadoux and Hyden in the Avon Wheatbelt biogeographic region.

Conservation status
This banksia is classified as "Priority Four" by the Government of Western Australia Department of Parks and Wildlife, meaning that is rare or near threatened.

References

shanklandiorum
Plants described in 1988